Joseph Frew (1873–unknown) was a Scottish footballer who played in the Football League for Sheffield United.

References

1873 births
Date of death unknown
Scottish footballers
English Football League players
Association football forwards
Sheffield United F.C. players
Glossop North End A.F.C. players
Wishaw Juniors F.C. players
Footballers from North Ayrshire
People from Stevenston